SS Edward P. Alexander was a Liberty ship built in the United States during World War II. She was named after Edward P. Alexander, a Confederate States Army Brigadier general and railroad executive.

Construction
Edward P. Alexander was laid down on 21 September 1943, under a Maritime Commission (MARCOM) contract, MC hull 1505, by J.A. Jones Construction, Brunswick, Georgia; sponsored by Mrs. E.A. Lotz, and launched on 23 November 1943.

History
She was allocated to the Wilmore Steamship Company, on 30 November 1943. On 15 June 1946, she was laid up in the National Defense Reserve Fleet in the James River Group, Lee Hall, Virginia. On 7 January 1947, she was turned over to the Italian Government, which in turn sold her to Fratelli d'Amico, Rome, for $544,506, on 20 January 1947. She was renamed Orizia. She ran aground off Veracruz Harbor on 20 January 1963, and was scrapped in 1970.

References

Bibliography

 
 
 
 
 

 

Liberty ships
Ships built in Brunswick, Georgia
1943 ships
James River Reserve Fleet
Liberty ships transferred to Italy